The England House is a historic house at 2121 Arch Street in Little Rock, Arkansas. It is a broad two-story brick building, capped by a hip roof with gabled dormers.  The main facade has a porch extending across its facade, supported by large brick piers.  Its basic form is reminiscent of the Prairie School of design, but the house has Classical elements, including its (now enclosed) south side porch, which is supported by large Tuscan columns.  The house was built in 1914 to a  design by architect Charles L. Thompson.

The house was listed on the National Register of Historic Places in 1982, and is included in Governor's Mansion Historic District.

See also
National Register of Historic Places listings in Little Rock, Arkansas

References

Houses on the National Register of Historic Places in Arkansas
Colonial Revival architecture in Arkansas
Prairie School architecture in Arkansas
Houses completed in 1914
Houses in Little Rock, Arkansas
National Register of Historic Places in Little Rock, Arkansas
Historic district contributing properties in Arkansas